Tillandsia myosura is a plant species in the genus Tillandsia. This species is native to Bolivia, Argentina, Paraguay, and Uruguay.

References

myosura
Flora of South America
Plants described in 1878